SM U-139 was the lead ship of her class, one of the submarines serving in the Imperial German Navy in World War I. She was commissioned on 18 May 1918 under the command of Lothar von Arnauld de la Perière, who named the submarine Kapitänleutnant Schwieger, after Walther Schwieger, who had sunk the  in 1915. She only sailed on one war patrol, during which she sunk four ships. U-139 surrendered to France on 24 November 1918 and shortly afterwards became French submarine Halbronn (until 24 July 1935 when she was broken up).

Action of 14 October 1918

On the 14 October 1918, U-139 attacked the Portuguese civilian steamer SS São Miguel, which was being escorted by the Portuguese Navy small naval trawler NRP Augusto de Castilho in the Atlantic Ocean. Augusto Castilho covered the escape of São Miguel by engaging U-139 for several hours, until being destroyed.

Summary of raiding history

References

Notes

Citations

Bibliography

External links

1917 ships
World War I submarines of Germany
German Type U 139 submarines
U-boats commissioned in 1918
Ships built in Kiel